Mick O'Brien may refer to:

Mick O'Brien (boxer) (born 1954), Australian Olympic boxer
Mick O'Brien (footballer, born 1893), Irish international football player
Mick O'Brien (footballer, born 1979), English football player
Mick O'Brien (musician) (born 1961), Irish musician

See also
 Michael O'Brien (disambiguation)